Hans Emil Alexander Gaede  (19 February 1852 in Kolberg – 16 September 1916 in Freiburg im Breisgau) was a Prussian officer, and later General of Infantry during World War I. He commanded Army Detachment Gaede and was a recipient of the Pour le Mérite.

Life 
Gaede was born on 18 February 1852 in the Kingdom of Prussia. He entered the army in 1870 as a cadet in the 2nd Grenadier Regiment and participated in the Franco-Prussian War. He was commissioned as a Second Lieutenant on 18 November 1870.

Reactivated for World War I; Gaede was Deputy Commander of the XIV Corps, commanded by Ernst von Hoiningen. He later got the command of six landwehr regiments which became the Army Detachment Gaede, or Army Detachment B. Gaede lead his troops in defending the upper Alsace region, however serious illness resulted in Gaede being retired again in September 1916. He died mere weeks later, at the age of 64.

Awards
 Iron Cross 2nd Class (1870)
 Iron Cross 1st Class
 Pour le Mérite (25 August 1915)

References

 Hanns Möller: Geschichte der Ritter des Ordens pour le mérite im Weltkrieg, Band I: A-L, Verlag Bernard & Graefe, Berlin 1935

1852 births
1916 deaths
German Army generals of World War I
Generals of Infantry (Prussia)
Recipients of the Pour le Mérite (military class)
Recipients of the Iron Cross (1870), 2nd class
Recipients of the Iron Cross (1914), 1st class